X Carinae is a Beta Lyrae variable in the constellation Carina. It ranges between magnitudes 7.9 and 8.65 over a period of approximately 1.08 days.

References

Carina (constellation)
Beta Lyrae variables
072698
A-type main-sequence stars
041793
Carinae, X
Durchmusterung objects